Sessilida is the largest order of the peritrich ciliates.

List of families 
 Ellobiophryidae
 Epistylididae
 Lagenophryidae
 Operculariidae
 Rovinjellidae
 Scyphidiidae
 Vaginicolidae
 Vorticellidae
 Zoothamniidae

References

External links 
 

Oligohymenophorea
Ciliate orders